Disconnect is the debut studio album by American musician Jes, and was released on April 7, 2007. A remix album, Into the Dawn (The Hits Disconnected) was released the next year, featuring remixes for songs on Disconnect, along with several new songs.

Track listing

Into the Dawn (The Hits Disconnected)

References

2007 albums
Jes (musician) albums
Black Hole Recordings albums